Ignatius Huang Shou-cheng (23 July 1923 – 30 July 2016) was a Chinese Catholic bishop.

Ordained to the priesthood in 1949, Huang Shou-cheng was clandestinely ordained a bishop in 1985 and then served as bishop of the Roman Catholic Diocese of Funing, China.

Notes

1923 births
2016 deaths
20th-century Roman Catholic bishops in China
People from Fu'an
21st-century Roman Catholic bishops in China